Museums in Ireland may refer to:

Museums in the Republic of Ireland
Museums in Northern Ireland